Emilio Fraietta (born October 23, 1955) is a former Canadian football defensive back who played five seasons with the Edmonton Eskimos of the Canadian Football League. He played college football at the College of the Siskiyous. He also played junior football for the Edmonton Wildcats of the Canadian Junior Football League.

Early years
Fraietta was born in Italy on October 23, 1955. His family moved to Edmonton when he was 12 years old. He played high school football at Archbishop O'Leary Catholic High School in Edmonton, Alberta .

Junior football
Fraietta played three years of junior football for the Edmonton Wildcats of the Canadian Junior Football League, winning a national title in 1977.

College career
Fraietta played one year for the College of the Siskiyous Eagles after his junior football career.

Professional career
Fraietta tried out three times for the Edmonton Eskimos before making the team in 1979. He played in 80 games for the team from 1979 to 1983, winning the Grey Cup four times.

References

External links
Just Sports Stats

Living people
1955 births
Players of Canadian football from Alberta
Canadian football defensive backs
Canadian football return specialists
American football defensive backs
Canadian players of American football
Italian players of Canadian football
Canadian Junior Football League players
Edmonton Elks players
Italian expatriates in Canada
Canadian football people from Edmonton